Tussaaq Island is an island of Greenland. It is located in Tasiusaq Bay in the Upernavik Archipelago within the Avannaata municipality.

Islands of the Upernavik Archipelago